The Faroe Islands women's national handball team are the women's team for the Faroe Islands.

In June 2017 the team advanced for the first time from the Qualification Phase 1 to Phase 2 of the European Women's Handball Championship qualification, when they won both matches in their group in the 2018 European Women's Handball Championship qualification which were against Greece and Finland.

Results

World Championships

European Championship

Team

Current squad
The squad chosen for the two qualification matches for the 2022 European Women's Handball Championship qualification, against Austria in Tórshavn and Maria Enzersdorf, in March 2021.

Head coach: Sonni Larsen

Extended squad
The following players have been called up to the Faroese squad within the past 12 months.

See also
Faroe Islands men's national handball team

References

External links
Official website
IHF profile

Handball in the Faroe Islands
Handball